The  are film-specific prizes awarded solely by movie critics and writers in Tokyo, Japan.

In 1967, the awards were cancelled following a series of demoralizing national political scandals that became known as "The Black Mist" and eventually enveloped Japan's baseball industry. In 1975, the awards were revived, and have continued until the present day. The annual award ceremony is held in a variety of places in Tokyo every February.

Winning one of these awards is considered to be a great honour.

In addition, the winning films themselves have a tendency to receive high distinctions in other film festivals around the world. Recent acclaimed nominations include films like Nobody Knows (2004), Tasogare Seibei (2002), Spirited Away (2001), and Battle Royale (2001).

Categories
There are following categories:
Best Film
Best Actor
Best Actress
Best Supporting Actor
Best Supporting Actress
Best Director
Best Foreign Film
Best Newcomer
Best Screenplay
Best Cinematography
Special Award

References

External links
Blue Ribbon Awards at imdb.com
Blue Ribbon Awards Official Homepage  at web.archive.org

Blue Ribbon Awards  at allcinema.net

 
Awards established in 1950
Recurring events established in 1950
1950 establishments in Japan